Blayne Nutron Weaver (born April 9, 1976) is an American actor, and filmmaker. He is best known for voicing Peter Pan in Return to Never Land (2002).

Early life
Weaver was born in Bossier City, Louisiana on April 9, 1976.

Career
Weaver began to perform in the children's theater group The Peter Pan Players in Shreveport, Louisiana. His first major film performance was in the independent film Where the Red Fern Grows. In the late 1990s, he appeared in several TV movies and was also a guest star on several shows including ER, JAG, and Chicago Hope. In 2001, he became the new voice of Disney's Peter Pan, and has performed that voice in various children's films as well as in recordings for the Disney theme parks.

In 2001, Weaver co-wrote the film Manic, which starred actor Joseph Gordon-Levitt. He continues to play the voice of Peter Pan and pursue acting in Los Angeles. In late 2004, he directed, wrote and starred in the short film Losing Lois Lane, which made a big impact online. He then wrote, directed and starred in Secret Identity Productions' (SIP) first feature film Outside Sales, which won awards on the film festival circuit and was released nationwide through Echo Bridge Entertainment. Weaver wrote, directed and played a small role in SIP's next feature, Weather Girl, with an ensemble cast that boasted Tricia O'Kelley, Mark Harmon, Jon Cryer and Jane Lynch.  Weather Girl enjoyed an extensive festival run followed by a ten-city theatrical and a worldwide television and DVD release. Weaver wrote, directed and stars in his next feature film 6 Month Rule with a cast featuring Martin Starr, Jaime Pressly, John Michael Higgins and Dave Foley.

In 2016, Weaver wrote and directed Cut to the Chase, a feature film he also starred in about an ex-con that sets out in search of his kidnapped sister through the criminal underbelly of Shreveport, Louisiana.  He also starred in the feature film Where We're Meant to Be by Michael Howard that deals with the interconnected stories of various characters during the pivotal changes and moments in their lives. His performance earned him a Best Actor nomination at the Eastern NC Film Festival.

In 2019, Weaver directed the Netflix original movie Santa Girl. The movie is about Santa's daughter, Cassandra "Cassie" Claus, (played by Jennifer Stone) wanting to find herself and see the world despite the wishes of her father (played by Barry Bostwick) who wants her to take over the family business. It first premiered at the Alamo Drafthouse Cinema in Winchester, Virginia.

In 2020, Weaver co-wrote American Pie Presents: Girls' Rules with David H. Steinberg.

Filmography

Film

Television

Video games

Theme parks

Production credits

Writer

Director

Producer

References

Secret Identity Productions

External links
 Official Website
 

1976 births
Living people
American male film actors
American male television actors
American male voice actors
American male screenwriters
Film producers from Louisiana
Film directors from Louisiana
Male actors from Louisiana
Screenwriters from Louisiana